Roger Paul Neilson,  (June 16, 1934 – June 21, 2003) was a Canadian professional ice hockey coach, most notably in the NHL, where he served with eight teams. Known as Captain Video because of his technological contributions to the game, he is a member of the Hockey Hall of Fame in the builder category. Alongside his decorated coaching abilities, Neilson is commonly remembered today for his many antics which resulted in the creation of several NHL rules.

Born in Toronto, Neilson attended a public high school, North Toronto Collegiate Institute. Neilson's coaching career began as a student at McMaster University in Hamilton, Ontario, where he continued to coach until graduation with a degree in physical education in both hockey and baseball.

Coaching career
Neilson's coaching career began in 1966 as head coach of the Ontario Hockey League's Peterborough Petes, then the junior farm team of the Montreal Canadiens, and he remained for 10 years in Peterborough, Ontario, where he maintained a home until his death. He also worked at the University of Windsor with a summer hockey camp program, which led to camps from Port Hope, Ontario to Israel.

Neilson moved into professional hockey coaching with the Dallas Black Hawks in the Central Hockey League in 1976–77.

Neilson's entry into the National Hockey League (NHL) came in 1977 with the Toronto Maple Leafs, when he was hired to replace Red Kelly as the head coach of the team. Neilson coached the Toronto Maple Leafs (1977–78), the Buffalo Sabres (1979–81, assistant and head coach), Vancouver Canucks (1981–84, assistant and head coach), Los Angeles Kings (1983–84), Chicago Blackhawks (1984–87, assistant), New York Rangers (1989–93), Florida Panthers (1993–95), Philadelphia Flyers (1997–2000), and for two games with the Ottawa Senators in April 2002.

Neilson's tenure with Toronto lasted until 1979, when Neilson was fired as head coach of the Maple Leafs by owner Harold Ballard. There was outrage throughout the players, media, and general public. Ballard then relented, but wanted Neilson to enter the next game with a paper bag over his head as "the mystery coach", but Neilson refused and coached the next game as if nothing had happened.

Neilson was initially an assistant coach with Vancouver, but he took over as head coach after Harry Neale was suspended for taking part in an altercation with fans during a brawl against the Quebec Nordiques. When the team went unbeaten in the next seven games, he was given the job permanently. It was in his new capacity that Neilson led the team on its run to the 1982 Stanley Cup Finals. 

After five seasons with the Rangers and Panthers, Neilson led the Flyers to first place in the Eastern Conference in the 1999–2000 season. With the Flyers leading in the conference standings at the midseason break, Neilson earned the honour to coach the Eastern Conference squad in the All-Star Game. Previously, based on his performance with the Canucks, he had coached the Campbell Conference All-Stars at the 1983 All-Star Game. But a Neilson-coached team fell short of expectations once again, as the Flyers were ousted by the New Jersey Devils in seven games in the Eastern Conference championship round.

Lemieux 'hit' controversy
The peak and valley of Neilson's stay with the Rangers came in the 1991–92 season, when they captured the Presidents' Trophy with the best record in the league. The Rangers entered the playoffs as prohibitive favorites to win their first Stanley Cup since 1940, only to be eliminated by the Pittsburgh Penguins in six games in the Patrick Division finals.  

Neilson's reputation as a so-called old school coach was put on a microscope in Game 2 of the series, when Rangers player Adam Graves fractured the left wrist of Penguins superstar Mario Lemieux with a two-handed baseball swing of his stick. Graves stated that he was swinging on the glove to loosen his grip on the stick to deal with the puck, which reflected Neilson's belief for one to go for the hands.

'Yes, no question about it. I kill penalties, too. I hit the gloves, also, once in a while. But to take a swing like he did ... that certainly came from the coach." Lemieux said after the injury. He added, "Certainly a contract was on me that game. I'm not saying Roger Neilson told Graves to go after me, but he told his players to go after me."

Graves was assessed only a minor penalty on the play and allowed to take part in Game 3, in which he scored the first goal of a 6–5 overtime victory. After he was suspended for the remainder of the series as a result of a league hearing, the well-motivated Penguins rallied to win their next seven games, the series and the Stanley Cup Finals. The Rangers did not win the Stanley Cup until after switching coaches in 1994.

Non-coaching career
Neilson worked for the Edmonton Oilers as a video analyst during the 1984 Stanley Cup Playoffs, culminating in the Oilers' first Stanley Cup championship, and the Chicago Blackhawks as an assistant to head coach Bob Pulford from 1984 to 1987. From 1995 to 1997, he was an assistant coach for the St. Louis Blues.

During the 1987–88 and 1988–89 seasons, Neilson did not coach but served as a color commentator for TSN with Jim Hughson and Gary Green.

Retirement from hockey
Neilson went on medical leave from the Flyers just before the 2000 playoffs for cancer treatment but was later informed that he had been permanently replaced by Craig Ramsay. Neilson's unceremonious dismissal by Flyers General Manager Bobby Clarke was widely lamented by fans and media as lacking class and respect. Neilson's doctors advised the Flyers that he lacked the strength to perform his duties as head coach. Neilson insisted on trying to return at the end of the first round of the playoffs, but Clarke refused. He even tried to defend his decision in the press, stating, "Roger got cancer - that wasn't our fault. We didn't tell him to go get cancer. It's too bad that he did. We feel sorry for him, but then he went goofy on us."

Neilson was then hired as an assistant coach for the Senators. For the last two games of the 2001–02 season, which were inconsequential to the standings, head coach Jacques Martin stepped away from the bench, allowing Neilson to take the reins and become the ninth man to coach 1,000 games. The following season, the Senators won the Presidents' Trophy as the regular season and advanced to the Eastern Conference Finals. It was public knowledge that Neilson's cancer was terminal when the Senators were ousted in a seven-game series.

Neilson's overall regular-season record was 460 wins, 378 losses, 159 ties, and 3 overtime losses.

Coaching legacy
Neilson dedicated his entire life to coaching and hockey. He had no family ties and would stay up late into the night watching video and analyzing games.

Among his most well-known innovations was the use of videotape to analyze other teams, leading to the nickname "Captain Video". He was also the first to use microphone headsets to communicate with his assistant coaches.

In situations where the face-off was in the opposition's end and there were three or less seconds to go in the first and/or second period, Neilson would pull his goaltender for an extra attacker for a potential shot on net off the ensuing face-off. His reasoning was that if the other team gained possession of the puck, it would be virtually impossible for the opposition to score from their end in the mere seconds that were left.  No other coach would consider this radical move, and it was indicative of his innovative thinking.

Neilson was well known for closely reading the rule book with the intent of exploiting loopholes. During one particular game in his first season coaching the Petes, he was down two men in a 5-on-3 situation for the last minute of the game. Realizing that more penalties could not be served under the existing rules, Neilson intentionally put too many men on the ice every ten seconds. The referees stopped the play and a faceoff was held, relieving pressure on the defence. In addition, Neilson also took advantage of fans throwing objects onto the ice to deliberately cause stoppages of play late in a game. After these displays, the rules were changed so that a call for too many men on the ice in a 5-on-3 situation, or a delay-of-game penalty in a 5-on-3 situation, or any deliberate act to stop play (i.e., objects thrown on the ice, or the net being intentionally dislodged) in the last two minutes of regulation or in overtime now results in a penalty shot.

Neilson also discovered that if he put a defenceman in net instead of a goaltender during a penalty shot, the defenceman could rush the attacker and cut down the latter's angle of shot, greatly reducing the chances of a goal. In 1968, he used this information in an OHL game between Neilson's Peterborough Petes and the opposing Toronto Marlboros. Neilson replaced Petes goaltender Pete Kostek with defenseman Ron Stackhouse. Stackhouse successfully blocked Frank Hamill's penalty shot attempt by charging out as soon as Hamill crossed the blue line. The rules state that a team must use a goaltender in net for a penalty shot and that the goaltender cannot leave the crease until the skater has touched the puck.

One game during a time-out, Neilson told his goaltender, "...when we pull you, just leave your goal stick lying in the crease." When the other team gained possession, they sent the puck the length of the ice toward the open net, only to deflect wide when it hit the goal stick lying in the crease. The rule was changed the next season so that a goal would be awarded in such a situation.

Neilson also broke the rules, in a sense, when he did not like what was happening on the ice. As the Canucks coach during Game 2 of the 1982 Campbell Conference Final playoff series against the Chicago Blackhawks, he felt his team was unfairly penalized on several occasions during the third period. He took a trainer's white towel and held it on a hockey stick, as if to wave a white flag. Three other Canucks players did the same thing, and all were ejected from the game. By doing this, Neilson inadvertently started an NHL tradition. Canucks fans waved white towels by the thousands at the next game, a playoff tradition that continues to this day and is widely copied by other hockey teams.

Life after hockey
Neilson was awarded a Doctor of Laws by McMaster University in 2001 (see below). He was inducted into the Hockey Hall of Fame as a builder in November 2002. He was also appointed as a Member of the Order of Canada {CM} in 2002. The City of Peterborough renamed George Street South Roger Neilson Way opposite the Memorial Centre Arena in 2003; the address of the Arena was supposed to be changed to 1 Roger Neilson Way. The Ottawa Senators have named their coaches office at Scotiabank Place The Roger Neilson Room. The City of Ottawa renamed their Minor Peewee AAA Hockey Division after Neilson in 2005. Also in 2005, the Ontario Hockey League created an award for the top academic player attending college or university and named it the Roger Neilson Memorial Award.

In 1999, Neilson was diagnosed with bone cancer, which spread to become skin cancer in 2001. He died on June 21, 2003, only five days after his 69th birthday, and the funeral was held in Northview Pentecostal Church in Peterborough.

Shortly after his death, the Ottawa Senators Foundation announced plans to build "Roger's House" (French: "La maison de Roger"), later renamed Roger Neilson House, a paediatric palliative care facility built in his memory on the grounds of the Children's Hospital of Eastern Ontario in Ottawa. The building was opened on April 21, 2006, by the Premier of Ontario, Dalton McGuinty.

In September 2004, Roger Neilson Public School, a new elementary school in Peterborough, opened. The name was chosen because of Neilson's commitment to teaching, which exemplified the qualities of the Character Education program of the Kawartha Pine Ridge District School Board.

On April 7, 2011, Rogers Arena in Vancouver commemorated Neilson's contribution to the NHL and Vancouver Canucks, in particular to the tradition he created during the 1982 playoff series with the Chicago Blackhawks, later named "Towel Power", by erecting a large statue of him in the courtyard of Rogers Arena.

The Florida Panthers dedicated the press box to Neilson, their first coach, in 2013.

Coaching record

References

External links
 
 Order of Canada Citation
 Roger's House Website
 Roger Neilson's Hockey Camp and Coaches' Clinic Site

1934 births
2003 deaths
Buffalo Sabres coaches
Canadian ice hockey coaches
Canadian people of Swedish descent
Canadian television sportscasters
Deaths from cancer in Ontario
Chicago Blackhawks coaches
Chicago Blackhawks scouts
Deaths from bone cancer
Edmonton Oilers personnel
Florida Panthers coaches
Hockey Hall of Fame inductees
Ice hockey people from Toronto
Los Angeles Kings coaches
McMaster University alumni
Members of the Order of Canada
National Hockey League broadcasters
New York Rangers coaches
Ottawa Senators coaches
Peterborough Petes coaches
Philadelphia Flyers coaches
St. Louis Blues coaches
Toronto Maple Leafs coaches
Vancouver Canucks coaches